|}

The Greenham Stakes is a Group 3 flat horse race in Great Britain open to three-year-old colts and geldings. It is run over a distance of 7 furlongs at Newbury in April.

History
The event is named after Greenham, the civil parish where Newbury Racecourse is located. It was established in 1906, and was initially contested over a mile.

The race continued with its original length until the start of World War II. It was not staged from 1941 to 1948, and resumed with a distance of 7 furlongs and 60 yards in 1949. It was shortened to 7 furlongs in 1956.

The Greenham Stakes can serve as a trial for various colts' Classics in Europe. The last winner to achieve victory in the 2000 Guineas was Frankel in 2011, and the most recent 2,000 Guineas winner to compete in the Greenham Stakes was Night of Thunder, the 2014 runner-up.

Records

Leading jockey (5 wins):
 Steve Donoghue – Sydmonton (1911), Polygnotus (1919), Silvern (1920), Green Fire (1924), Zelina (1934)
 Joe Mercer – Counsel (1955), Heathen (1968), Boldboy (1973), Kris (1979), Creag-an-Sgor (1984)

Leading trainer (6 wins):
 Henry Cecil – Wollow (1976), Kris (1979), Cajun (1982), Faustus (1986), Enrique (1999), Frankel (2011)
 Richard Hannon Sr. – Rock City (1990), Redback (2002), Major Cadeaux (2007), Paco Boy (2008), Dick Turpin (2010), Olympic Glory (2013)

Winners since 1931

Earlier winners

 1906: Rocketter
 1907: Donna Caterina
 1908: Sir Toby
 1909: Minoru
 1910: Bronzino
 1911: Sydmonton
 1912: Jingling Geordie
 1913: Shogun
 1914: Sunny Lake
 1915: Let Fly / Sunfire *
 1916: Analogy
 1917–18: no race
 1919: Polygnotus
 1920: Silvern
 1921: no race
 1922: Weathervane
 1923: Parth
 1924: Green Fire
 1925: Sparus
 1926: Friar Wile
 1927: Lordland
 1928: The Wheedler
 1929: Sidonia
 1930: Christopher Robin

* The 1915 race was a dead-heat and has joint winners.

See also
 Horse racing in Great Britain
 List of British flat horse races

References

 Paris-Turf:
 Racing Post:

 galopp-sieger.de – Greenham Stakes.
 ifhaonline.org – International Federation of Horseracing Authorities – Greenham Stakes (2019).
 pedigreequery.com – Greenham Stakes – Newbury.
 

Flat horse races for three-year-olds
Newbury Racecourse
Flat races in Great Britain
1906 establishments in England
Recurring sporting events established in 1906